Northridge is the name of some places in the U.S. state of Ohio:
Northridge, Clark County, Ohio
Northridge, Montgomery County, Ohio

nl:Northridge (Ohio)